Abassi may refer to:

 Abassi, the Supreme Creator in the pantheon of the Nigerian Efik people
 Abassi cotton, a variety of Egyptian cotton, grown in lower Egypt
Abassi Boinaheri (born 1976), French footballer
Houcine Abassi (born 1947), Tunisian politician
Ines Abassi (born 1982), Tunisian poet and journalist
Abazi, the supreme Creator of the Oron people of Nigeria and Cameroon.

See also 
 Abass
 Abasi (disambiguation)
 Abbasi (disambiguation)